Clavatula flammulata is a species of sea snail, a marine gastropod mollusk in the family Clavatulidae.

Description
The size of an adult shell varies between 38 mm and 48 mm.

Distribution
This species occurs in the Atlantic Ocean along Gabon.

References

 Bernard, P.A. (Ed.) (1984). Coquillages du Gabon [Shells of Gabon]. Pierre A. Bernard: Libreville, Gabon. 140, 75 plates pp.

External links

flammulata
Gastropods described in 1952